The Summit is a 2012 documentary film about the 2008 K2 disaster, directed by Nick Ryan. It combines documentary footage with dramatized recreations of the events of the K2 disaster, during which – on the way to and from the summit of one of the most dangerous mountains in the world – 11 climbers died during a short time span.

Reconstructions were filmed on the North face of the Eiger and on the Jungfraujoch glacier in Switzerland in March 2011. Pemba Gyalje Sherpa was present for the reconstructions along with Pasang Lama, Tshring Lama, and Chhiring Dorje Sherpa, all of whom were on K2 in August 2008 during the events. Footage from the various teams was used and includes Hoselito Bite, Ger McDonnell, Wilco van Rooijen, Cecilie Skog, Fredrik Sträng, and Alberto Zerain.

The film premiered at the 2012 London Film Festival.

Reception
Metacritic, which uses a weighted average, assigned the film a score of 63 out of 100 based on 17 critics, indicating "generally favorable reviews".

Accolades 
In 2013, the film was nominated for the Grand Jury Prize – Documentary and won Best Editing – World Cinema Documentary at the 2013 Sundance Film Festival. The film also won an IFTA award for Best Documentary at the 2014 Irish Film and Television Awards, as well as Best Feature-length Mountain Film at the 2013 Banff Mountain Film Festival.

References

External links
 
 

K2
2012 documentary films
2012 films
Irish documentary films
Swiss documentary films
American sports documentary films
English-language Irish films
English-language Swiss films
Documentary films about disasters
Mountaineering films
Documentary films about climbing
Films set in Pakistan
Films shot in Gilgit-Baltistan
2010s English-language films
British sports documentary films
2010s American films
2010s British films